Vince Harder (born c.1982) is a New Zealand R&B/pop recording artist and producer. His most notable song to date is "Everything", which reached number one in New Zealand on the New Zealand Singles Chart in 2008. In May 2010, he released the single "Say This With Me" which peaked at number 39 on the singles chart. As of June 2015, he has released the new single "Find Love" as well as a music video.

History
Vince was born and raised in West Auckland, New Zealand. He has also played the lead role as 'Simba' in the Australian stage production of The Lion King. In 2005, he came third in the Australian TV version of The X Factor, beating over 100,000 people who originally auditioned for a place in the finals.

In 2009 he performed live gigs to more than 100,000 people including the main support slot on Teddy Riley's Blackstreet arena tour of Australia & New Zealand, and a show-stealing, headline performance on TV3's Coca-Cola Christmas in the Park concerts in Christchurch and Auckland.

Harder is managed by August Avenue.

On October 18, 2019 he performed halfway through the first day of the Downer Nines Rugby League World Cup in Australian city Parramatta.

Record releases and songwriting
On 17 November 2008 he released his first solo single, "Strobelight", which he wrote and produced. It received extensive airplay in New Zealand. He performed this single on the New Zealand breakfast TV show Good Morning New Zealand in front of a live audience in late 2008. In April 2009 he brought out a single named "Lyrical Love" which was a Top 20 hit in New Zealand. The video for "Lyrical Love" was filmed in various Auckland nightclubs and featured a cast of hundreds.

In May 2010 he released a brand new single titled "Say This With Me". It was a Top 40 hit in NZ. Harder is currently at work on his self-produced and titled debut album, which is to be released in early 2011. His next single is to be entitled "I Want This Forever".

In 2012 he wrote and produced the number one hit song, "Come On Home" for New Zealand boy band sensation, Titanium.

In 2015 he produced a new song named "Shot me down".

Discography

Albums

Charting singles 

Notes

Featured singles

References

External links
 Vince Harder Official 
 Vince Harder Discography 
 Amplifier.co.nz profile

1980s births
APRA Award winners
New Zealand people of German descent
New Zealand people of Samoan descent
New Zealand male singer-songwriters
New Zealand contemporary R&B singers
New Zealand pop singers
The X Factor (Australian TV series) contestants
Living people
Musicians from Auckland
21st-century New Zealand male singers